Dmitri Aleksandrovich Vershkov (born 27 May 2002) is a Russian football player. He plays for FC Rotor Volgograd.

Club career
He made his debut in the Russian Premier League for FC Rotor Volgograd on 24 April 2021 in a game against FC Zenit Saint Petersburg.

References

External links
 
 

2002 births
Living people
Russian footballers
Association football defenders
FC Rotor Volgograd players
Russian Premier League players
Russian Second League players